In 2008, Virginia, for the first time since 1964, cast its electoral college presidential votes for a Democrat, Barack Obama. It also elected a United States senator, members of the United States House of Representatives, and local officers such as county board and school board members.

Republican candidate selections and activities
On February 12, 2008, a Presidential primary decided which candidate would receive Virginia's delegates to the 2008 National convention. The results were:

In a second step, city and county caucuses elected delegates to Congressional District and the State Conventions. The third step was a series of Congressional District conventions held in late April and early May 2008; they elected some of Virginia's delegates to the Republican National Convention. The Republican State Convention (Richmond, Virginia May 30–31, 2008) chose the Republican Senate nominee, twenty-seven (27) delegates, and twenty-seven (27) alternate
delegates at large to the 2008 Republican National Convention. Since the Republican primary is winner-take-all, all National Convention delegates must vote for John McCain on the first ballot. The main issues for State Convention delegates was their preference for party chairman and U.S. Senate nominee. James S. Gilmore secured the Senate nomination over Robert G. Marshall by 70 votes out of 10,378. Although Gilmore outspent Marshall by more than 8 to 1, a coalition of anti-abortion activists, libertarians and some moderates from Northern Virginia almost succeeded in nominating Marshall. Later in the day, that coalition elected Delegate Jeffrey M. Frederick as state party chair over incumbent John H. Hager (Jenna Bush's father-in-law).

The Eighth and Tenth Congressional districts chose their congressional candidates in primary elections June 10, 2008.

In October 2008, Virginia's Republican Party chairman Jeffrey M. Frederick compared Democratic presidential nominee Barack Obama to Osama bin Laden because of his association with Bill Ayers. Both had friends who bombed buildings in the United States. A McCain spokeswoman complained Frederick's remarks were "not appropriate."

On November 3, 2008, the Virginia Republican Party charged that local election officials had mailed absentee ballots ten days late to military members overseas. Its lawsuit sought to modify the rule which requires all absentee votes to be received by the time that the polls close in order to give overseas absentee voters and additional 10 days to return their ballots.

For 2008, the Republican Party of Virginia raised $489,024 compared with $2,200,851 for the Democratic party.

Democratic candidate selections
The 2008 Presidential Preference Primary was held on February 12, 2008. Joe Biden, Hillary Clinton, John Edwards, Dennis Kucinich, Barack Obama, and Bill Richardson all turned in enough signatures to the Virginia State Board of Elections to qualify to run in the Commonwealth. Chris Dodd did not file with the State Board of Elections by the December 14, 5:00 pm deadline.

Delegates to the 2008 National Convention were selected in proportion to the votes gained in the primary. The results of the primary are:

Each city or county held a caucus to elect delegates to the state convention in proportion to the primary results during the third week of April.
The Democratic Party of Virginia will send 103 delegates and 14 alternates to the national convention in Denver, Colorado. Eighteen of the 103 delegates were automatically allocated to party leaders. In May 2008, 54 delegates and 11 alternates were elected at Congressional District Conventions. An additional 20 at large delegates, 11 party leader and elected official delegates, and 3 alternates were elected at the Virginia State Democratic Convention on June 14, 2008, in Hampton, Virginia.
The allocation of delegates between the two candidates which received at least 15% of the vote, based on the primary results, are as follows:

In the November 4, 2008 General Election, the Barack Obama / Joe Biden ticket carried the state with 1,897,941 (52.21%) to 1,699,428 (46.75%). Thirty-two percent of that margin came from Arlington County in Northern Virginia. Democrat Mark Warner also defeated former Governor James Gilmore for the United States Senate 2,302,480 (64.69%) to 1,211,654 (34.04%).

For 2008, the Democratic Party of Virginia raised $2,200,851 compared with $489,024 for the Republican party.

See also
 2008 United States Senate election in Virginia
 2008 United States House of Representatives elections in Virginia
 2008 United States presidential election in Virginia

References

 
Virginia